Chunli Li  (born 28 February 1962) is a Chinese-born New Zealand female professional table tennis player. She won a gold, silver and two bronze medals at the 2002 Commonwealth Games to cap off her long career.

Li was born in Guiping, Guigang, Guangxi in 1962. She became one of the top table tennis players in China, specialising as a doubles player.  Li migrated to New Zealand in 1987 and subsequently represented New Zealand until she retired in 2004 to concentrate as the national coach. She competed at four Olympic Games and one Commonwealth Games for New Zealand. Since 2011, she came out of her "retirement" and started representing New Zealand again. Li led the New Zealand team at the 2014 Commonwealth Games in Glasgow.

In the 2017 New Year Honours, Li was appointed a Member of the New Zealand Order of Merit, for services to table tennis.

References 

1962 births
Living people
Commonwealth Games gold medallists for New Zealand
Commonwealth Games silver medallists for New Zealand
Commonwealth Games bronze medallists for New Zealand
New Zealand female table tennis players
People from Guigang
Olympic table tennis players of New Zealand
Table tennis players at the 1992 Summer Olympics
Table tennis players at the 1996 Summer Olympics
Table tennis players at the 2000 Summer Olympics
Table tennis players at the 2004 Summer Olympics
Table tennis players at the 2002 Commonwealth Games
Commonwealth Games medallists in table tennis
Members of the New Zealand Order of Merit
Table tennis players from Guangxi
Chinese emigrants to New Zealand
Naturalised table tennis players
Medallists at the 2002 Commonwealth Games